Hans Röhrig (4 November 1919 – 13 July 1943) was a  former German Luftwaffe fighter ace and recipient of the Knight's Cross of the Iron Cross during World War II. Hans Röhrig was credited with 75 victories. He recorded 56 victories over the Eastern Front and 19 victories recorded over the Western Front.

In the War
Hans Röhrig was first assigned to Erprobungsgruppe 210. He flew many fighter-bomber missions over England during the Battle of Britain and according to one source, recorded five aerial victories during this time but those victories remain unconfirmed. On 1 May 1941, Röhrig was transferred to JG 53 stationed on the Eastern Front. He recorded his first victory on 25 July, when he shot down a Russian DB-3 twin-engine bomber. Röhrig relocated with 3./JG 53 to the Mediterranean theatre at the end of 1941. From bases in Sicily, he flew missions over Malta but was unable to add any further victory during this time.

In May 1942, I./JG 53 relocated back to the Eastern Front. On 6 August 1942 Leutnant Hans Röhrig (flying Bf.109G-2 W.Nr 13480) was shot down by a Yak-1 fighter, apparently flown by Soviet ace Starshiy Leytenant Mikhail Baranov (183 IAP, 269 IAD). At that time Röhrig had eight victories to his credit. Röhrig claimed his 10th victory on 20 August. In September, Röhrig was particularly successful recording 39 victories during the month. On September 1942, Röhrig had reached 56 victories.

His unit, I./JG 53 were again relocated to the Mediterranean theatre in late September 1942. Leutnant Röhrig was awarded the Ritterkreuz on 2 October 1942. During October, the unit operated over Malta to participate into bomber escort missions. In November 1942, Röhrig was appointed Staffelkapitän of 9./JG 53. He successfully led the unit during the campaigns in Tunisia and Sicily. He recorded his last victories, two USAAF P-38 twin-engine fighters, over Sicily on 11 July 1943. He shot down another two USAAF P-38 on the same day. On 13 July 1943, Röhrig led 9./JG 53 escorting Junkers Ju 52 transport aircraft to drop paratroops on the Catania plains. He failed to return from the mission, being shot down and killed  by RAF Spitfire fighters which intercepted the escort mission. Röhrig was posthumously promoted to Hauptmann.

Awards
 Iron Cross (1939) 2nd and 1st Class
 Ehrenpokal der Luftwaffe (26 October 1942)
 Knight's Cross of the Iron Cross on 2 October 1942 as Leutnant and Staffelkapitän of the 9./Jagdgeschwader 53

Notes

References

Citations

Bibliography

 Christer Bergstrom, Andrey Dikov & Vlad Antipov (2006) Black Cross – Red Star. Air War over the Eastern Front. Volume 3. Everything for Stalingrad. Eagle Editions Ltd. .
 
 
 

1919 births
1943 deaths
Luftwaffe pilots
German World War II flying aces
Luftwaffe personnel killed in World War II
Recipients of the Knight's Cross of the Iron Cross
Military personnel from Bavaria
Aviators killed by being shot down
People from Memmingen